Daniel Hiester (June 25, 1747 – March 7, 1804) was an American political and military leader from the Revolutionary War period to the early 19th Century.  Born in Berks County in the Province of Pennsylvania, he was a member of the Hiester Family political dynasty. He was the brother of John Hiester and Gabriel Hiester, cousin of Joseph Hiester, and the uncle of William Hiester and U.S. Rep. Daniel Hiester (1774–1834).

Biography
Hiester's father, also named Daniel Hiester, emigrated from Silesia in 1737 and settled in Goshenhoppen (now Bally), Pennsylvania, afterward purchasing a tract of several thousand acres in Berks County.  After completing his education, the young Hiester engaged in the mercantile business in Montgomery County, Pennsylvania. He owned slaves as well.

During the American Revolution, Hiester served as a colonel and later a brigadier general of the Pennsylvania Militia.  He was a member of the Pennsylvania General Assembly from 1778 to 1781. In 1784 he was elected to the supreme executive council of Pennsylvania, and later in 1787 he was appointed as a commissioner to negotiate the Connecticut land claims dispute.

Hiester was elected to the United States House of Representatives representing Pennsylvania, serving from March 4, 1789, until his resignation on July 1, 1796.  He then moved to Hagerstown, Maryland, and was again elected to the House representing Maryland, serving from March 4, 1801, until his death in Washington, D.C., on March 7, 1804. He was among the number that voted to move the U.S. capital from Philadelphia to a place on the Potomac later named Washington, D.C.

He was buried in Zion Reformed Graveyard in Hagerstown, Maryland and has a cenotaph at the Congressional Cemetery in Washington.

See also
 List of United States Congress members who died in office (1790–1899)

Notes

References

The Political Graveyard

1747 births
1804 deaths
People from Berks County, Pennsylvania
People of colonial Pennsylvania
Hiester family
Pennsylvania Dutch people
Anti-Administration Party members of the United States House of Representatives from Pennsylvania
Democratic-Republican Party members of the United States House of Representatives from Pennsylvania
Democratic-Republican Party members of the United States House of Representatives from Maryland
Members of the Pennsylvania House of Representatives
American slave owners
19th-century American politicians
Pennsylvania militiamen in the American Revolution
Burials in Maryland